The Conference of State Court Administrators (COSCA), which was established in 1955 and incorporated in 1982, consists of the state court administrators and equivalent officials in each of the states and territories of the United States.  Its mission is to provide a national forum to assist state court administrators.

External links

 Official website of the Conference of State Court Administrators

Courts in the United States